Felix De Laet (born 30 November 1993), known by his stage name Lost Frequencies, is a Belgian DJ and record producer. He is best known for his singles "Are You with Me" in 2014, "Reality" in 2015, and "Where Are You Now" with Calum Scott in 2021.

Background

Name origin 
The name "Lost Frequencies" was first used when De Laet had used old songs, which he calls 'lost frequencies' to make remixes when he started the project.

Career

2014–2015: "Are You with Me"
In 2014, Lost Frequencies made a remix of country artist Easton Corbin's "Are You with Me". The song had originally appeared in Corbin's second studio album, All Over the Road, but had not been released as a single. Lost Frequencies remixed the song and uploaded it to SoundCloud. Armada Music A&R, and founder of The Bearded Man label, Marwen Tlili discovered the record and subsequently signed it. The official release was on 27 October 2014. The track topped Belgium's Ultratop chart on 15 November 2014, reaching number two in the Walloon chart as well. In 2015, the single peaked the top of the charts of Australia and Austria. It was also charted in several countries in Europe, reaching the top 10 in Finland, France, Netherlands, Norway, Spain, Germany, Poland, Ireland, Switzerland, United Kingdom, Sweden and Turkey.

2016–2017: Less Is More 
On 3 June 2016, Lost Frequencies released a single, "Beautiful Life", featuring Sandro Cavazza, which is the lead single for his debut studio album. He announced on Twitter that he planned to release the album in September 2016. On 8 September, he remixed a Major Lazer song "Cold Water" featuring Justin Bieber. He released his debut studio album titled Less Is More on 21 October 2016. It includes his massive hit "Are You with Me" as well as follow-up singles "Reality", "Beautiful Life", "What Is Love 2016" and "All Or Nothing" ft. Axel Ehnström. They are soon joining The Chainsmokers on tour in May and June 2017. Less Is More was shortlisted by IMPALA (The Independent Music Companies Association) for the Album of the Year Award 2016, which rewards on a yearly basis the best album released on an independent European label.

2018–2021: Found Frequencies
In partnership with Armada Music, De Laet launched his own record label named Found Frequencies, stating "it will serve as a home" for his music and as the "go-to label for up-and-coming talents". His second studio album titled Alive and Feeling Fine was released on 4 October 2019.

2021–present: Subsequent singles
In 2021, Lost Frequencies teamed up with British singer Calum Scott for the song "Where Are You Now", which became De Laet's first Top 40 hit for a few years in a number of territories outside of the Benelux region. Some of the countries where the record became a Top 10 hit included Germany, where it peaked at number 5, and Ireland, where it peaked at number one on the Irish Singles Chart.

On 3 June 2022, Lost Frequencies released the song "Questions" with British singer James Arthur.

Discography

Less Is More (2016)
Alive and Feeling Fine (2019)

Awards and nominations

DJ Magazine Top 100

References

External links

 Official website

Belgian DJs
Belgian electronic musicians
Belgian record producers
Living people
1993 births
Tropical house musicians
Deep house musicians
Electronic dance music DJs
Remixers